Matteo Polisi (born April 15, 1998) is a Canadian professional soccer player.

Early life 
Polisi began playing soccer at age four with Coquitlam Metro-Ford SC, where he played from 2002 until 2011. In 2008 and 2009, he had training stints with the youth teams of Belgian club Standard Liège. He also played for the BC provincial team at U13 level, serving as team captain. In September 2011, he joined the Vancouver Whitecaps Academy. In 2013, after being released by the Whitecaps, he returned to Coquitlam Metro-Ford SC, where he was named a ‘Player of Distinction’ by the Canadian Soccer Association in 2014, and with whom he won the 2015 BC Provincial U-15 Cup, after scoring a hat-trick in the final. In the spring of 2016, he joined the youth system of the Portland Timbers. In late 2016 and early 2017, he had trials in Europe with English clubs Birmingham City and Derby County, and German club FC Nürnberg.

University career
In 2017, he began attending Simon Fraser University, where he played for the men's soccer team. He made his debut on August 31, 2017, scoring two goals against the University of Mary Marauders. In his freshman season, he was named the GNAC Freshman of the Year and was named a GNAC First-Team All-Star. On October 6, 2018, he scored a hat trick against the Seattle Pacific Falcons. After his sophomore season, he was named a GNAC First Team All-Star again, as well as an All-West Region First Team All-Star, and was named the Div. II West Region Player of the Year. On October 3, 2019, he scored another hat trick against the Saint Martin's Saints. After his third season, he was named a GNAC First Team All-Star for the third time and was named to the United Soccer Coaches’ NCAA Div. II All-American second team. Over his time at Simon Fraser, he scored 36 goals and added 18 assists in 52 matches. He declared for the 2021 MLS SuperDraft, but was ultimately not selected.

Club career
In 2017, Polisi joined the TSS FC Rovers in the Premier Development League. In 2017, he scored three goals in 12 appearances. In 2018, he scored two goals in 14 appearances and led the team with five assists. In 2019, he led the team in scoring with six goals in 13 appearances. He also played at the amateur level with Rino's Tigers in the Vancouver Metro Soccer League.

In February 2021, Polisi signed his first professional contract with Canadian Premier League side Pacific FC. He scored his first professional goal on July 7 against York United. With Pacific, he won the 2021 CPL title. He re-signed with the club for the 2022 season. At the conclusion of the season, Polisi departed the club.

Personal
He is the younger brother of Marcello Polisi, who is also a professional soccer player.

Honours

Club
Pacific FC
Canadian Premier League: 2021

References

External links 
 

1998 births
Living people
Association football midfielders
Canadian soccer players
Soccer people from British Columbia
People from Coquitlam
Canadian expatriate soccer players
Expatriate soccer players in the United States
Canadian expatriate sportspeople in the United States
Vancouver Whitecaps FC players
Portland Timbers players
Simon Fraser Clan men's soccer players
TSS FC Rovers players
Pacific FC players
USL League Two players
Canadian Premier League players